The management of atrial fibrillation (AF) is focused on preventing temporary circulatory instability, stroke and other ischemic events. Control of heart rate and rhythm are principally used to achieve the former, while anticoagulation may be employed to decrease the risk of stroke. Within the context of stroke, the discipline may be referred to as stroke prevention in atrial fibrillation (SPAF). In emergencies, when circulatory collapse is imminent due to uncontrolled rapid heart rate, immediate cardioversion may be indicated.

The primary factors determining AF treatment are duration and evidence of circulatory instability. Cardioversion is indicated with new onset AF (for less than 48 hours) and with circulatory instability. If rate and rhythm control cannot be maintained by medication or cardioversion, it may be necessary to perform electrophysiological studies with ablation of abnormal electrical pathways.

Patients can be classified, based on how much they are limited during physical activity, according to the European Heart Rhythm Association score of atrial fibrillation.

Anticoagulation
Most patients with AF are at increased risk of stroke. The possible exceptions are those with lone AF (LAF), characterized by absence of clinical or echocardiographic findings of other cardiovascular disease (including hypertension), related pulmonary disease, or cardiac abnormalities such as enlargement of the left atrium, and age under 60 years . The incidence of stroke associated with AF is 3 to 5 percent per year in the absence of anticoagulation, which is significantly higher compared to the general population without AF (relative risk 2.4 in men and 3.0 in women). A systematic review of risk factors for stroke in patients with nonvalvular AF concluded that a prior history of stroke or TIA is the most powerful risk factor for future stroke, followed by advancing age, hypertension, and diabetes. For patients with LAF, the risk of stroke is very low and is independent of whether the LAF was an isolated episode, paroxysmal, persistent, or permanent. The risk of systemic embolization (atrial clots migrating to other organs) depends strongly on whether there is an underlying structural problem with the heart (e.g. mitral stenosis) and on the presence of other risk factors, such as diabetes and high blood pressure. Finally, patients under 65 are much less likely to develop embolization compared with patients over 75. In young patients with few risk factors and no structural heart defect, the benefits of anticoagulation may be outweighed by the risks of hemorrhage (bleeding). Those at a low risk may benefit from mild (and low-risk) anticoagulation with aspirin (or clopidogrel in those who are allergic to aspirin). In contrast, those with a high risk of stroke derive most benefit from anticoagulant treatment with warfarin or similar drugs. A new class of anticoagulant drugs, the direct thrombin inhibitors (Dabigatran), has recently arrived on the scene and shown efficacy in treating complications of nonvalvular chronic AF.

In the United Kingdom, the NICE guidelines recommend using a clinical prediction rule for this purpose. The CHADS2 score is a well-validated simple clinical prediction rule for determining the risk of stroke (and therefore who should and should not be anticoagulated with warfarin); it assigns points (totaling 0–6) depending on the presence or absence of co-morbidities such as hypertension and diabetes. In a comparison of seven prediction rules, the best was CHADS2 which performed similarly to the SPAF and Framingham prediction rules.

The following treatment strategy is based on the CHADS2 score:

More recently, the 2010 European Society of Cardiology (ESC) guidelines have recommended a risk factor based approach to stroke prevention, and de-emphasised the artificial stratification into low/moderate/high risk, given the poor predictive value of these 3 categories. To complement the CHADS2 score, the ESC guidelines on atrial fibrillation management recommend using the new CHA2DS2-VASc score (Congestive heart failure, Hypertension, Age ≥75 years (doubled), Diabetes mellitus, Stroke (doubled), Vascular disease, Age 65–74 years, Sex category], which is more inclusive of 'stroke risk modifier' risk factors. The new CHA2DS2-VASc score (Congestive heart failure, Hypertension, Age ≥75 years (doubled), Diabetes mellitus, Stroke (doubled), Vascular disease, Age 65–74 years, Sex category] has also been validated in other large independent cohorts.

The most recent validation study used nationwide data on 73,538 hospitalized non-anticoagulated patients with AF in Denmark, whereby in 'low risk' subjects (score=0), the rate of thromboembolism per 100 person-years was 1.67 (95% confidence interval 1.47 to 1.89) with CHADS2 and 0.78 (0.58 to 1.04) with CHA2DS2-VASc score, at 1 year follow-up. Thus, those categorised as 'low risk' using CHA2DS2-VASc score were 'truly low risk' for thromboembolism, and consistent with other cohorts, CHA2DS2-VASc score performed better than CHADS2 in identifying these 'low risk' patients. The c-statistics at 10 years follow-up were 0.812 (0.796 to 0.827) with CHADS2 and 0.888 (0.875 to 0.900) with CHA2DS2-VASc, respectively – and suggests that CHA2DS2-VASc score also performed better than CHADS2 in predicting 'high risk' patients.

To compensate for the increased risk of stroke, anticoagulants may be required. However, in the case of warfarin, if someone with AF has a yearly risk of stroke that is less than 2%, then the risks associated with taking warfarin outweigh the risk of getting a stroke from AF. However, since these older data, there is now greater recognition of the importance of good anticoagulation control (as reflected by time in therapeutic range) as well as greater awareness of bleeding risk factors as well as data from recent trials that aspirin carries a similar rate of major bleeding to warfarin, especially in the elderly.

Latest ESC guidelines on atrial fibrillation recommend assessment of bleeding risk in AF using the HAS-BLED (Hypertension, Abnormal renal/liver function, Stroke, Bleeding history or predisposition, Labile International Normalized Ratio, Elderly, Drugs/alcohol concomitantly) bleeding risk schema as a simple, easy calculation, whereby a score of ≥3 indicates "high risk" and some caution and regular review of the patient is needed. The HAS-BLED score has also been validated in an anticoagulated trial cohort of 7329 patients with AF – in this study, the HAS-BLED score offered some improvement in predictive capability for bleeding risk over previously published bleeding risk assessment schemas and was simpler to apply. With the likely availability of new oral anticoagulants that avoid the limitations of warfarin (and may even be safer), more widespread use of oral anticoagulation therapy for stroke prevention in AF is likely.

AF in the context of mitral stenosis is associated with a seventeenfold increase in stroke risk.

Acute anticoagulation
If anticoagulation is required urgently (e.g. for cardioversion), heparin or similar drugs achieve the required level of protection much quicker than warfarin, which will take several days to reach adequate levels.

In the initial stages after an embolic stroke, anticoagulation may be risky, as the damaged area of the brain is relatively prone to bleeding (hemorrhagic transformation). As a result, a clinical practice guideline by National Institute for Health and Clinical Excellence recommends that anticoagulation should begin two weeks after stroke if no hemorrhage occurred.

In cases of chronic stable AF without any other risk factors for thromboembolism, the Seventh American College of Chest Physicians (ACCP) Conference on Antithrombotic and Thrombolytic Therapy recommends initiating warfarin without heparin bridging. While there is a theoretical concern of causing a transient prothrombotic state with the initiation of warfarin, a study comparing the initiation of warfarin alone with warfarin and low molecular weight heparin shows no significant difference in the concentrations of endogenous anticoagulants or in markers of active clot formation.

Chronic anticoagulation
Among patients with nonvalvular AF, anticoagulation with warfarin can reduce stroke by 60% while antiplatelet agents can reduce stroke by 20%. The combination of aspirin and clopidogrel reduced the risk of stroke by 25%, but increased the risk of major bleeding by 57%, which means that this combination is inferior to warfarin, and is not an alternative for patients who are judged to be at high risk of bleeding on warfarin therapy.

Warfarin treatment requires frequent (usually monthly) monitoring with a blood test resulting in a standardized number known as international normalized ratio (INR), often referred to by clinicians as "pro-time"; this determines whether the correct dose is being used. In AF, the usual target INR is between 2.0 and 3.0 (a higher target, INR between 2.5 and 3.5, is used in patients with prior thromboembolism, rheumatic heart disease, and mechanical artificial heart valves, many of whom may also have AF). A high INR may indicate increased bleeding risk, while a low INR would indicate that there is insufficient protection from stroke.

An attempt was made to find a better method of implementing warfarin therapy without the inconvenience of regular monitoring and risk of intracranial hemorrhage. A combination of aspirin and fixed-dose warfarin (initial INR 1.2–1.5) was tried. Unfortunately, in a study of AF patients with additional risk factors for thromboembolism, the combination of aspirin and the lower dose of warfarin was significantly inferior to the standard adjusted-dose warfarin (INR 2.0–3.0), yet still had a similar risk of intracranial hemorrhage.

The U.S. Food and Drug Administration (FDA) approved Dabigatran ("Pradaxa," and other names) on 19 October 2010, for prevention of stroke in patients with non-valvular atrial fibrillation. The approval came after an advisory committee recommended the drug for approval on 20 September 2010 although caution is still urged by reviewers. Dabigatran is an anticoagulant that works as a direct thrombin inhibitor, and does not require blood tests for INR monitoring, while offering similar results in terms of efficacy in the treatment of non-valvular AF. The place of the new thrombin inhibitor class of drugs in the treatment of chronic AF is still being worked out.

Elderly patients
Very elderly (patients aged 75 years or more) may benefit from anticoagulation provided that their anticoagulation does not increase hemorrhagic complications, which is a difficult goal. Patients aged 80 years or more may be especially susceptible to bleeding complications, with a rate of 13 bleeds per 100 person-years. This bleed rate would seem to preclude use of warfarin; however, a randomized controlled trial found benefit in treating patients 75 years or over against aspirin with a number needed to treat of 50. However, this study had very low rate of hemorrhagic complications in the warfarin group.

Left atrial appendage occlusion
Left atrial appendage occlusion is an experimental alternative to anticoagulants. During cardiac catheterization, a device (such as the Watchman device) consisting of an expandable nitinol frame is introduced into the left atrial appendage, the source of blood clots in more than 90% of cases. A trial comparing closure against warfarin therapy found closure to be non-inferior when measured against a composite end point of stroke, cardiovascular death and systemic embolism.

The left atrial appendage can also be surgically amputated, sutured or stapled simultaneously with other cardiac procedures such as a maze procedure or during mitral valve surgery.

Rate control versus rhythm control
AF can cause disabling and annoying symptoms. Palpitations, angina, lassitude (weariness), and decreased exercise tolerance are related to rapid heart rate and inefficient cardiac output caused by AF. Furthermore, AF with a persistent rapid rate can cause a form of heart failure called tachycardia-induced cardiomyopathy. This can significantly increase mortality and morbidity, which can be prevented by early and adequate treatment of the AF.

There are two ways to approach these symptoms using drugs: rate control and rhythm control. Rate control seeks to reduce the heart rate to one that is closer to normal, usually 60 to 100 bpm, without trying to convert to a regular rhythm. Rhythm control seeks to restore with cardioversion the regular heart rhythm and maintain it with drugs. Studies suggest that rhythm control is mainly a concern in newly diagnosed AF, while rate control is more important in the chronic phase. Rate control with anticoagulation is as effective a treatment as rhythm control in long term mortality studies, the AFFIRM Trial.

The AFFIRM study showed no difference in risk of stroke in patients who have converted to a normal rhythm with antiarrhythmic treatment, compared to those who have only rate control. AF is associated with a reduced quality of life, and while some studies indicate that rhythm control leads to a higher quality of life, the AFFIRM study did not find a difference.

A further study focused on rhythm control in patients with AF and simultaneous heart failure, based on the premise that AF entails a higher mortality risk in heart failure. In this setting, too, rhythm control offered no advantage compared to rate control.

In patients with a fast ventricular response, intravenous magnesium significantly increases the chances of successful rate and rhythm control in the urgent setting without significant side-effects.

Cardioversion
Cardioversion is a noninvasive conversion of an irregular heartbeat to a normal heartbeat using electrical or chemical means:
 Electrical cardioversion involves the restoration of normal heart rhythm through the application of a DC electrical shock.
 Chemical cardioversion is performed with drugs, such as amiodarone, dronedarone, procainamide, ibutilide, propafenone or flecainide.

The main risk of cardioversion is systemic embolization of a thrombus (blood clot) from the previously fibrillating left atrium. Cardioversion should not be performed without adequate anticoagulation in patients with more than 48 hours or unknown duration of AF. Anticoagulation is adequate if warfarin is given with target INR between 2 and 3 for three to four weeks prior to cardioversion, and continued for at least four weeks after cardioversion. Cardioversion may be performed in instances of AF lasting more than 48 hours if a transesophogeal echocardiogram (TEE) demonstrates no evidence of clot within the heart.

Whichever method of cardioversion is used, approximately 50% of patients relapse within one year, although the continued daily use of oral antiarrhythmic drugs may extend this period. The key risk factor for relapse is duration of AF, although other risk factors that have been identified include the presence of structural heart disease, and old age.

Rate control
Rate control is achieved with medications that work by increasing the degree of block at the level of the AV node, effectively decreasing the number of impulses that conduct down into the ventricles. This can be done with:
 Beta blockers (preferably the "cardioselective" beta blockers such as metoprolol, bisoprolol, atenolol)
 Calcium channel blockers (i.e. diltiazem or verapamil)
 Cardiac glycosides (i.e. digoxin) – have limited use, apart from in the sedentary elderly patient

In addition to these agents, amiodarone has some AV node blocking effects (particularly when administered intravenously), and can be used in individuals when other agents are contraindicated or ineffective (particularly due to hypotension).

Diltiazem has been shown to be more effective than either digoxin or amiodarone.

Drugs used to control the rate of AF may cause side effects, especially fatigue and dyspnea. These are avoided by the more radical "ablate and pace" treatment (see below).

Maintenance of sinus rhythm
The mainstay of maintaining sinus rhythm is the use of antiarrhythmic agents. Recently, other approaches have been developed that promise to decrease or eliminate the need for antiarrhythmic agents.

Antiarrhythmic agents
The anti-arrhythmic medications often used in either pharmacological cardioversion or in the prevention of relapse to AF alter the flux of ions in heart tissue, making them less excitable, setting the stage for spontaneous and durable cardioversion. The agents work by prolonging the Effective Refractory Period (ERP) either by blocking sodium ions (Class I drugs) or by blocking potassium ions (Class III drugs) or a mixture of both. These medications are often used in concert with electrical cardioversion.

Catheter ablation
In patients with AF where rate control drugs are ineffective and it is not possible to restore sinus rhythm using cardioversion, non-pharmacological alternatives are available. For example, to control rate it is possible to destroy the bundle of cells connecting the upper and lower chambers of the heart – the atrioventricular node – which regulates heart rate, and to implant a pacemaker instead. This "ablate and pace" technique has an important place in the treatment of AF< as it is the only reliably effective method for relieving the symptoms of the arrhythmia and can be used when other methods have failed (as they do in up to 50% of cases of persistent AF). Although this procedure results in a regular (paced) heart rhythm it does not prevent the atria from fibrillating and therefore long-term warfarin anticoagulation may still be required.

Ablation (AF ablation) is a method that increasingly is used to treat cases of recurrent AF that are unresponsive to conventional treatments. Radiofrequency ablation (RFA) uses radiofrequency energy to destroy abnormal electrical pathways in heart tissue. Other energy sources include laser, cryothermy and high intensity ultrasound. The energy emitting probe (electrode) is placed into the heart through a catheter inserted into veins in the groin or neck. Electrodes that can detect electrical activity from inside the heart are also inserted, and the electrophysiologist uses these to "map" an area of the heart to locate the abnormal electrical activity before eliminating the responsible tissue.

Efficacy and risks of catheter ablation of AF are areas of active debate. A worldwide survey of the outcomes of 8745 ablation procedures demonstrated a 52% success rate (ranging from 14.5% to 76.5% among centers), with an additional 23.9% of patients becoming asymptomatic with addition of an antiarrhythmic medication. In 27.3% of patients, more than one procedure was required to attain these results. There was at least one major complication in 6% of patients. Death has been found to occur in 1 in 1000 people who undergo this procedure. A thorough discussion of results of catheter ablation was published in 2007; it notes that results are widely variable, due in part to differences in technique, follow-up, definitions of success, use of antiarrhythmic therapy, and in experience and technical proficiency.

Cox maze
The Cox maze procedure is an open-heart surgical procedure intended to eliminate AF and was first performed at St. Louis' Barnes Hospital (now Barnes-Jewish Hospital) in 1987. "Maze" refers to the series of incisions made in the atria, which are arranged in a maze-like pattern. The intention was to eliminate AF by using incisional scars to block abnormal electrical circuits (atrial macroreentry) that AF requires. This procedure required an extensive series of endocardial (from the inside of the heart) incisions through both atria, a median sternotomy (vertical incision through the breastbone) and cardiopulmonary bypass (heart-lung machine). A series of improvements were made, culminating in 1992 in the Cox maze III procedure, which is now considered to be the "gold standard" for effective surgical cure of AF. The Cox maze III is sometimes referred to as the "traditional maze", the "cut and sew maze", or simply the "maze".

Minimally invasive maze procedures
Minimaze procedures are minimally invasive versions of the original Cox maze procedure but without cardiac incisions. These procedures do not require a median sternotomy (vertical incision in the breastbone) or cardiopulmonary bypass (heart-lung machine). They use laser, cryothermy, radiofrequency, or acoustic energy to ablate atrial tissue near the pulmonary veins and make other required ablations to mimic the maze.

Minimally invasive surgical (endoscopic) maze procedures are now routinely conducted at hospitals around the US. This approach was developed in the early 2000s.

The Ex-Maze is a minimally invasive procedure, first reported in 2007, that also creates a lesion pattern across both atria epicardially on the beating heart. As with other procedures off-bypass, the surgeon can confirm that AF corrects to normal sinus rhythm during the procedure. Laparoscopic instruments are used to access the pericardium through the diaphragm. Like many heart-cauterizing instruments, the Ex-Maze device uses heat generated by a radiofrequency coil. The coil is inside a plastic tube that uses suction to maintain contact against the beating heart's surface.

Research
Two 2021 systematic reviews and meta-analyses concluded that more than 1 g/d marine omega-3 fatty acids is associated with an increased risk of atrial fibrillation (AF).

References

Cardiac electrophysiology
Cardiovascular diseases